is a former butterfly swimmer from Japan, who won the bronze medal in the 4 × 100 m medley relay at the 2000 Summer Olympics in Sydney, Australia. Her winning teammates in that race were Mai Nakamura, Masami Tanaka, and Sumika Minamoto.

References
 databaseOlympics
 Profile on FINA site

1974 births
Living people
Japanese female butterfly swimmers
Olympic swimmers of Japan
Swimmers at the 2000 Summer Olympics
Swimmers at the 2004 Summer Olympics
Olympic bronze medalists for Japan
Sportspeople from Hyōgo Prefecture
Olympic bronze medalists in swimming
World Aquatics Championships medalists in swimming
Medalists at the 2000 Summer Olympics
Universiade medalists in swimming
Universiade silver medalists for Japan
Medalists at the 1997 Summer Universiade